The Best of Silkk the Shocker is a compilation album released by Priority Records containing the greatest hits of rapper Silkk the Shocker. It was released on October 4, 2005.

Track listing
"I'm a Soldier" — 5:08  
"It Ain't My Fault" — 3:19  
"He Did That" (featuring Mac) — 3:25
"You Ain't Gotta Lie to Kick It" — 5:04  
"Let Me Hit It" (featuring Mystikal) — 2:41 
"That's Cool" (featuring Trina) — 3:42
"I Represent" — 4:56 
"How We Mobb" (featuring Master P) — 4:00
"It Ain't My Fault, Pt. 2" (featuring Mystikal) — 3:26 
"Who Can I Trust" — 3:35  
"Somebody Like Me" (featuring Mýa) — 4:13
"It's Time to Ride" (featuring Master P) — 3:05
"If I Don't Gotta" (featuring Fiend) — 5:25 
"Ghetto Tears" (featuring Master P) — 3:44 
"End of the Road" — 4:20  

2005 compilation albums
Silkk the Shocker albums
Priority Records compilation albums
Gangsta rap compilation albums